Neuhof is a municipality in the district of Fulda, in Hesse, Germany. It is situated 15 km southwest of Fulda.

Villages in Neuhof
Dorfborn
Giesel (Neuhof)
Hattenhof (Neuhof)
Hauswurz
Kauppen (Neuhof)
Rommerz
Tiefengruben (Neuhof)

People 
 Wilhelm Diegelmann (1861-1934), German actor

References

External links
Neuhof municipality

Fulda (district)